ATIP may refer to:

 Absolute Time in Pregroove (ATIP), a method of storing information on an optical medium
 Access to Information and Privacy (ATIP) Act, Canadian law administered by the Treasury Board Secretariat